Dylan Alcott defeated David Wagner in the final, 6–1, 4–6, 7–5 to win the quad singles wheelchair tennis title at the 2015 US Open.

Andrew Lapthorne was the defending champion, but was eliminated in the round-robin stage.

Draw

Final

Round robin
Standings are determined by: 1. number of wins; 2. number of matches; 3. in two-players-ties, head-to-head records; 4. in three-players-ties, percentage of sets won, or of games won; 5. steering-committee decision.

External links
 Draw

Wheelchair Quad Singles
U.S. Open, 2015 Quad Singles